Kobojo is a French video game developer and distribution company based in Paris.

Games

Mutants: Genetic Gladiators, released in April 2014
Primal Legends, released in April 2016
Zodiac: Orcanon Odyssey, released in November 2015

Litigation
In May 2012, Zynga sued Kobojo for trademark infringement for calling one of its games PyramidVille.

References

External links

Video game companies established in 2015
Video game companies of France
Video game development companies
Companies based in Paris
French companies established in 2015